Katie Burnett (born October 7, 1988) is an American racewalker.

High school career
Burnett was a two-time state meet placer at Desert Ridge High School in Mesa, Arizona. Burnett placed second in the 2007 USATF Junior Olympics with a 3,000-meter race walk time of 16:32. Burnett placed fourth in the Arizona Interscholastic Association state track and field championship high jump at 5-0 and eighth in the shot put at 35-8, both as a senior in 2007.

College career
Burnett threw the javelin a length of 131-6.75 at NCAA Division I for the University of Arizona in 2008.

Burnett is a six-time National Association of Intercollegiate Athletics All-American race walker at William Penn University and earned another All-America award at the national NAIA track and field championship in the javelin as a senior in 2011.

USA National Championships
Burnett placed 5th at the 2011 USA Outdoor Track and Field Championships 20 km. Burnett placed 1st at the 2011 USA Outdoor Track and Field Championships 50 km.

Burnett placed 4th at the 2013 USA Outdoor Track and Field Championships 20 km. Burnett placed 1st at the 2013 USA Outdoor Track and Field Championships 30 km.

Burnett placed 3rd at the 2015 USA Outdoor Track and Field Championships 20 km.

Burnett placed third in 20 km at 2016 United States Olympic Trials.

On January 28, 2017 in Santee, California - In her first 50 km, Burnett (after training in El Cajon, California) won the 2017 US National title Saturday afternoon, and also set new American records in the 40 km and 50 km at the USATF 50K Race Walk Championships.

On June 23, 2017, Burnett placed 4th at the 2017 USA Outdoor Track and Field Championships 20 km in a time of 1:38:39.60.

On August 13, 2017, Katie Burnett shatters American record in women’s 50 km race walk in London at the World Championship.

In 2019, she competed in the women's 50 kilometres walk at the 2019 World Athletics Championships held in Doha, Qatar. She finished in 17th place.

Competition record

Coaching 
As of 2021, Burnett coaches the Mountlake Terrace High School cross country team.

References

External links
 
 Katie Burnett racing highlights
 Katie Burnett article on racewalk.com
 Katie Burnett profile at William Penn University
 Katie Burnett racewalking article on  statesmenathletics.com

1988 births
Living people
Track and field athletes from Washington (state)
Track and field athletes from Arizona
William Penn Statesmen women's track and field athletes
Sportspeople from Bellevue, Washington
World Athletics Championships athletes for the United States
American female javelin throwers
Athletes (track and field) at the 2019 Pan American Games
Pan American Games track and field athletes for the United States
USA Outdoor Track and Field Championships winners
Arizona Wildcats women's track and field athletes